Physogasterini is a tribe of darkling beetles in the subfamily Pimeliinae of the family Tenebrionidae. There are about five genera in Physogasterini, found in the Neotropics.

Genera
These genera belong to the tribe Physogasterini
 Entomochilus Gay & Solier, 1843
 Philorea Erichson, 1834
 Physogaster Lacordaire, 1830
 Physogasterinus Kaszab, 1981
 Pimelosomus Burmeister, 1875

References

Further reading

 
 

Tenebrionoidea